Zachary "Zac" O'Brien (born 27 October 1990) is a former professional Australian rules footballer who played for the Brisbane Lions in Australian Football League (AFL). O'Brien was drafted by the Lions with the 23rd selection in 2014 rookie draft. He was promoted to the senior list during the week before their round 11, 2014 clash against the Carlton Football Club. He was delisted in October 2015.

In 2016, O'Brien joined West Adelaide in the SANFL.

References

External links

1990 births
Living people
Brisbane Lions players
Aberfeldie Football Club players
Yarrawonga Football Club players
Wangaratta Rovers Football Club players
Australian rules footballers from Victoria (Australia)
Sydney University Australian National Football Club players